Babylon was the capital city of Babylonia in ancient Mesopotamia, Middle East.

Babylon or Babylone may also refer to:

Places 
 Babil Governorate (or Babylon Province), Iraq
 Babylon University, in Al Hillah, Iraq
 Babylon (Egypt), an ancient city and Roman legion camp in Egypt
 Cairo, often referred to as Babylon in Medieval literature
 Babylon (Domažlice District), a municipality and village in the Czech Republic
 Babylon, Illinois, a community in the US state of Illinois
 Babylon (town), New York, a town in the US
 Babylon (village), New York, a village in the town of Babylon
Babylon station, Long Island Railroad station in village of Babylon
 Babylon Istanbul, a music venue in Istanbul, Turkey
 Sèvres – Babylone (Paris Métro), a station on lines 10 and 12 of the Paris Métro

Religion 
 Babylon, in rabbinic literature often used to refer to the Jewish diaspora, especially the historic Babylonian captivity
 Diocese of Babylon (disambiguation)
 Patriarch of Babylon of the Church of the East
 Babylon, a literal and figurative term used to refer to the city of Babylon, to Rome or the Roman Empire, or to evil
 Whore of Babylon or "Babylon the Great", a Christian allegorical figure from the Book of Revelation in the Bible
Babylon, a term used in the Rastafari movement and the Rainbow Family for any politically or economically oppressive society; see Vocabulary of the Rastafari movement

People
 Brian Babylon, American comedian and radio personality
 Babylon (singer), a South Korean R&B singer

Arts and entertainment

Film and television

Film
 Babylon (1980 film), a British film by Franco Rosso
 Babylon (1986 film), a British TV animated short in the Sweet Disaster series
 Babylon (1998 film), a Dutch film by Eddy Terstall
 Babylon (2022 film), an American film by Damien Chazelle

Television
 Babylon (TV series), a 2014 British comedy-drama
 Babylon (anime), a 2019–2020 Japanese series based on the novel series (see below)
 Babylon, a nightclub in the American version of Queer as Folk
 Babylon, a nightclub in the British version of Queer as Folk

Episodes
 "Babylon" (Carnivàle)
 "Babylon" (Mad Men)
 "Babylon" (Stargate SG-1)
 "Babylon" (The X-Files)

Literature
 Babylon (novel series), a 2015–2017 Japanese novel series by Mado Nozaki and Zain
 Babylon (Pelevin novel), or Generation "П", a 1999 novel by Viktor Pelevin
 Babylon (Babylone), a 2016 novel by Yasmina Reza

Music
 Babylon (opera), a 2012 opera by Jörg Widmann
 Babylon (band), an American progressive rock band
 Babylone (band), an Algerian pop band

Albums
 Babylon (Dr. John album) or the title song, 1969
 Babylon (Skindred album) or the title song, 2002
 Babylon (Ten album), 2000
 Babylon (W.A.S.P. album), 2009
 Babylon (William Control album), 2014
 Babylon, by Die Amigos, 2019
 Babylon, by OBK, 2003

Songs
 "Babylon" (ballad), a Child (traditional) ballad
 "Babylon" (David Gray song), 1999
 "Babylon" (The Tea Party song), 1997
 "Babylon", by 5 Seconds of Summer from Youngblood, 2018
 "Babylon", by Adam Again from Ten Songs by Adam Again, 1988
 "Babylon", by Angus and Julia Stone from Chocolates and Cigarettes, 2006
 "Babylon", by Aphrodite's Child from 666, 1972
 "Babylon", by Backyard Babies from Total 13, 1998
 "Babylon", by Circle of Dust from Disengage, 1998
 "Babylon", by Deathstars from Night Electric Night, 2009
 "Babylon", by Delain from We Are the Others, 2012
 "Babylon", by Don McLean from American Pie, 1971
 "Babylon", by Edguy from Theater of Salvation, 1999
 "Babylon", by Faster Pussycat from Faster Pussycat, 1987
 "Babylon", by Ill Bill from The Hour of Reprisal, 2008
 "Babylon", by Joey Bada$$ from All-Amerikkkan Badass, 2017
 "Babylon", by Lady Gaga from Chromatica, 2020
 "Babylon", by the New York Dolls from Too Much Too Soon, 1974
 "Babylon", by Oneohtrix Point Never from Age Of, 2018
 "Babylon", by Outkast from ATLiens, 1996
 "Babylon", by Pop Will Eat Itself from Dos Dedos Mis Amigos, 1994
 "Babylon", by Prince Ital Joe and Marky Mark from Life in the Streets, 1994
 "Babylon", by Riot from Nightbreaker, 1993
 "Babylon", by RX Bandits from Progress, 2001
 "Babylon", by Scars on Broadway from Scars on Broadway, 2008
 "Babylon", by Soulfly from Dark Ages, 2005
 "Babylon", by Starship from No Protection, 1987
 "Babylon", by Stratovarius from Episode, 1996
 "Babylon", by SZA from Z, 2014

Brands and enterprises 
 Babylon (software), a translation program, including the Babylon Toolbar, a browser hijacker
 Babylon Health, a British provider of health apps
 Babylon.js, a real time 3D-engine for web browsers
 Kino Babylon, a cinema in Berlin
 Babylon, a darknet market seized by law enforcement in July 2015

Other uses
 Project Babylon, a former Iraqi project for the construction of superguns

See also 

Babel (disambiguation), the name used in the Arabic Qur'an and the Hebrew Bible for the city of Babylon
Babylonia (disambiguation)
Rivers of Babylon (disambiguation)